Love Is What Life's All About is the tenth album by country singer Moe Bandy, released in 1978 on the Columbia label.

Track listing
"Love Is What Life's All About" (Carl Belew, Van Givens, Moe Bandy) - 2:37
"A Ghost of a Chance" (Steve Collom) - 2:43
"I Guess I Had a Real Good Time Last Night" (Carl Belew, Van Givens) - 2:36
"Big Flicking Baby" (Carl Belew, Van Givens, Ramsey Kearney, Moe Bandy) - 2:31
"For The Tears To Come" (Steve Collom) - 2:38
"Two Lonely People" (Tom Benjamin, Ed Penney) - 2:46
"Jambalaya (On The Bayou)" (Hank Williams) - 2:34
"Mom and Dad's Waltz" (Lefty Frizzell) - 2:45
"I Never Miss a Day (Missing You)" (Carl Belew, Van Givens, Moe Bandy) - 2:51
"Yippy Cry Yi" (Joseph P. Allen, Hoy H. Lindsey) - 2:49

Musicians
Bob Moore
Tommy Allsup
Hargus "Pig" Robbins
Weldon Myrick
Jerry Carrigan
Chip Young
Leo Jackson
Reggie Young
Charlie McCoy
Johnny Gimble

Backing
The Jordanaires
The Nashville Edition

Personnel
Sound engineers - Ron Reynolds, Billy Sherrill, Lou Bradley
Art Direction - Virginia Team
Design - Bill Barnes
Photography - J. Clark Thomas

1978 albums
Moe Bandy albums
Columbia Records albums
Albums produced by Ray Baker (music producer)